The Grassy Narrows road blockade is an ongoing roadblock in Canada that started in 2002 to prevent clearcutting of timber on Asubpeeschoseewagong First Nation territory.

History 
The Grassy Narrows road blockade began on December 2, 2002 and prevents logging trucks from entering Asubpeeschoseewagong First Nation territory (also known as Grassy Narrows First Nation). Grassy Narrows is located in northwestern Ontario near the town of Kenora. The blockade is on Ontario Provincial Highway 671 near Slant Lake.Since the 1990s logging near the community had accelerated which caused community members to act. Working with non-Indigenous environmentalists and human rights advocates, they began media campaigns to draw attention to their protest. Many people think the clearcutting is a clear violation of treaty rights and the sovereignty of the Anishinaabe nation. 

The Grassy Narrow’s chief and council wanted to stop the logging efforts by working within the federal system and use the Indian act. In 2008, the Ontario government began negotiating a resolution to the conflict, which ended the license for logging companies. In 2014, the provincial government stated they would monitor logging companies to make sure they adhered to the new proposed rules. However, many in the community remain skeptical.

Background 
In 1873, the Anishinaabe people participated and negotiated in Treaty 3 with the Government of Canada. The terms of this treaty are extremely contested by the Anishinaabe people and the Government of Canada as both groups disagree on its interpretation and assumptions. The Government of Canada at the time, wanted to expand farther into the West for more agricultural settlements. This treaty was seen as a way to secure and create a route through northwestern Ontario and further Canadian nation building. Anishinaabe leaders saw the treaty as a peace-and-friendship agreement. The Anishinaabe people wanted to share the land to ensure its survival but not surrender it according to oral histories and the unofficial versions of Treaty 3. The Government of Canada contests this stating the Anishinaabe right to land was surrendered once the treaty was signed.

See also 

 Mercury contamination in Grassy Narrows

Further reading 
 Willow, Anna J. Strong hearts, native lands: the cultural and political landscape of Anishinaabe anti-clearcutting activism. SUNY Press, 2012.

References

External links 
 The Star News Dec 2022
 Rick Wallace, Grassy Narrows Blockade: Reworking Relationships between Anishnabe and Non-Indigenous Activists at the Grassroots International Journal of Canadian Studies
 Luby, Brittany. Book review of Anna J. Willow, Strong Hearts, Native Lands in Left History: An Interdisciplinary Journal of Historical Inquiry and Debate 17.1 (2013).
 Burke, Nora Butler. "Building a ‘Canadian’Decolonization Movement: Fighting the Occupation at ‘Home.’." Anarchist Library Online (2004).

Environmental justice
Nonviolent occupation